Crash (stylised in all caps) is the fifth studio album by English singer-songwriter Charli XCX, released on 18 March 2022. It was her last album to be released under her record contract with Atlantic Records. Charli announced the album title, release date, and artwork on 4 November 2021. Her website was also updated with information about the album's 2022 tour. The album was preceded by the four singles "Good Ones", "New Shapes" featuring Christine and the Queens and Caroline Polachek, "Beg for You" featuring Rina Sawayama, "Baby" and two promotional singles, "Every Rule" and "Used to Know Me", the latter released as the fifth single in April 2022.

Whereas Charli's prior work was known for its experimental, hyperpop production, Crash features a more conventional dance-pop sound, with Charli dubbing it her "major label sell-out" record. Songs from the album include elements of pop music of the '80s and '90s, and Charli has cited Janet Jackson, among others, as a musical influence for the album. David Cronenberg's 1996 film of the same name inspired aesthetic themes of the album, including the title and artwork. Upon release, the album received generally positive reviews from music critics. Commercially, Crash is Charli XCX's most successful album to date, topping the charts in Australia, Ireland and the United Kingdom. It also became her first top ten album in New Zealand and the United States.

Background and recording 
In September 2019, Charli XCX released her third studio album, Charli, to critical acclaim. A previous version of her third album was originally slated for a 2017 release, although Charli later decided to scrap that project following most of its demo tracks being leaked on the Internet. Following the release of Charli, she explained in an interview with music magazine The Fader: "I'm not supposed to say this, I'm supposed to be like, in it, 'this album (Charli), stream it, buy it', but I'm like, already thinking about the next one, it's done, I'm onto the next level". A month after its release, she confirmed that she was already working on another album. In November 2019, she then stated that her current plans for the next year included the creation of two new albums.

During the months of January and February 2020, Charli published Instagram stories of herself in the studio with a variety of producers, including Patrik Berger and Justin Raisen, both of whom had previously collaborated on Charli's debut album True Romance. She also had recording sessions with longtime executive producer A. G. Cook, as well as Deaton Chris Anthony.

In March 2020, due to the COVID-19 pandemic, recording sessions for the album were canceled. On 6 April 2020, Charli XCX announced through a public Zoom call with fans that she would be working on a new album in self-isolation, with the tentative title How I'm Feeling Now. Charli decided to postpone Crash recording sessions, then only known loosely as the "Janet album", and began working on a new fourth studio album spur of the moment. Work on this album began in Charli's home on 3 April and continued until the album's release date of 15 May. Charli had first mentioned the "Janet album" on 6 April, when she posted a screenshot of a conversation with Cook, where she said, "And I wanted to do Janet album in September into quicker album in December", implying that she originally planned to release the "Janet album" in September and a "quicker", more impromptu album in December of the same year. Following the release of How I'm Feeling Now, Charli hinted that she was back at work on the "Janet album".

On 13 March 2021, she announced on TikTok that the album would be "poptastic". Days later, on 19 March, Charli debuted new songs for the first time on a Bandsintown virtual show, which would become commonly known amongst fans as "Don't Think Twice" (later revealed to be "Twice") and "What You Want" (later confirmed to be "New Shapes"). Following the event, she gave an interview in which she referred to the album as "poptastic" and added that she was "feeling extremely creative".

On 1 November 2021, she tweeted that she would be disclosing secrets about the album that week, and five hours later, she revealed the collaborators she would be working with on the album: Lotus IV, Christine and the Queens, Caroline Polachek, Oscar Holter, Digital Farm Animals, Rina Sawayama, Ian Kirkpatrick, Jason Evigan, Justin Raisen, SadPony, Ariel Rechtshaid, Ilya, Oneohtrix Point Never, Mike Wise, and Jon Shave. Oscar Holter had already been confirmed as a producer for the album with the album's first single "Good Ones". A collaboration with Caroline Polachek and Christine and the Queens, with production from Deaton Chris Anthony, had also been teased a few days before the announcement. The song, titled "New Shapes", was released as the album's second single. In early 2022, the third single from the album, "Beg For You" featuring Rina Sawayama, was released. A collaboration with Sawayama had been teased since 2019, and both artists confirmed there had been different previous attempts at a collaboration.

Release and promotion 

On 15 August 2021, following the announcement of the album's first song, she tweeted a picture of a grave with her own name engraved on it and the death date "March 18, 2022", which was thought to be the album's release day. The next day, she tweeted a behind-the-scenes video of a photoshoot of that grave, utilizing a fragment of "Good Ones". This grave would be featured in "Good Ones"' music video after it was released. It was widely hinted that the album would be published on 18 March 2022, because after the release of "Good Ones", she stated that the album might be released around that date.

The album was formally announced on 4 November, an hour before the release of the second song, on all of Charli's social media, along with the announcement of a 37-date tour, titled Crash: the Live Tour, across North America and Europe and a link to pre-save the album. It was also revealed that the album will have 12 tracks and last for 33 minutes. Later that day, Charli went live on TikTok and shared new snippets of new tracks, including the then-unknown tracks "Baby", "Constant Repeat", "Beg for You", and three other snippets.

On 19 December 2021, Charli posted an Instagram post with the caption "2022 sneak peak...", which included numerous images related to work for the album cycle, including images of photo op and recording behind the scenes, a talk with Rina Sawayama about their collaboration, and a video of Charli practicing with background dancers for the track "Baby".

Throughout late 2021 and early January 2022, Charli continued to share the samples she teased on TikTok, most notably the tracks "Beg for You" and "Baby". On 4 January, Charli uploaded a snippet of what appeared to be a music video for the song "Baby". On 20 January, it was reported via iTunes that the album's fifth track will be 2 minutes and 48 seconds long, which was later confirmed to be "Beg for You". On the same day, Charli revealed the title and a studio snippet of her collaboration with Rina Sawayama, "Beg for You". On 21 February 2022, the singer announced that a deluxe edition would be released the same week as the standard album. However, the deluxe edition was released a week later than the standard one, on 25 March.

The album's liner notes dedicate it to Sophie, a friend and collaborator of Charli who died in early 2021. Sophie had produced a number of tracks for Charli including the entirety of her 2016 EP Vroom Vroom, as well as the majority of her scrapped third studio album.

On 23 June, she participated in the Doritos event "Live from the Upside Down" in collaboration with the Netflix series Stranger Things.

On 14 December, she made a live performance on Discord.

Singles 

"Good Ones" was released as the album's lead single on 2 September 2021. It is a dance track mixed with synth-pop and electropop. The song received acclaim for critics with most of them highlighting its synth-pop production. Its music video, directed by Hannah Lux Davis, and filmed in Mexico. was released the same day as the song. "New Shapes" was released on 4 November 2021 as the album's second single, featuring Christine and the Queens and Caroline Polachek. The latter track was also met with positive reviews from critics for her move away from hyperpop and towards synth-pop. The music video was released a few days after. Charli XCX was set to appear on the ninth episode of Saturday Night Live's 47th season alongside Christine and the Queens and Polachek to promote the singles, but the performances were cancelled due to the rise of the coronavirus Omicron variant in New York City. The performance was later rescheduled to 5 March 2022. "Beg for You", a collaboration with Rina Sawayama, was released on 27 January 2022 as the album's third single. The song is a UK garage track with elements of '90s house music. It samples September's 2006 single "Cry for You", as well as the song "Don't Cry" by Belgian dance group Milk Inc. It received acclaim from music critics, highlighting its catchiness. "Baby" was released on 1 March 2022 as the album's fourth single. The track is an '80s-inspired post-disco track with new jack swing elements. It has received positive reviews for its catchiness and sultry production. On 14 March 2022, "Every Rule" was released as a promotional single, followed by "Used to Know Me" on 17 March 2022. "Used to Know Me" was released in April 2022 as the album's fifth single.

Themes

When teasing and promoting the record since May 2021, Charli took on an evil, demonic or soulless persona, so as to play into a deal-with-the-devil idea. George Griffiths of the Official Charts Company compared the concept to Marina's Electra Heart (2012). Visuals for the album include "femme fatale powers" and a multitude of "dark spells and curses" as well as signature nods to both cars and car crashes. Several publications found references to the David Cronenberg films, mainly the 1996 film of the same name and Videodrome, the former of which is also an aesthetic inspiration. Charli talked about the aesthetic themes and the reference to the Cronenberg film by saying, "Referencing Cronenberg is unavoidable when the album is called Crash. [...] For this album, I was exploring the idea of what the most sexualized, heightened, vampiric version of myself could be. And I think that also plays into the 'selling your soul' narrative [and] danger — it's very volatile, the image of this album. I think some people are really turned off by it, which is quite interesting, and some people love it. It's heightened sex, sexiness — that's where I was at. And I think that does relate back to Cronenberg's Crash because that book and that movie is about these people who want and feed off their favorite thing and will go to any length to feel this sexuality and connection." In accordance to this statement, Under the Radar wrote in their review: "The intersection of violence, sexuality, and technology explored within the album's cover art calls to mind influential science fiction writer and cultural prophet J. G. Ballard's contentious 1973-released novel Crash—and, by extension, Cronenberg's 1996-released film adaptation. Deft studies of humanity's psychological and physical transformation alongside technological and cultural advancement, both novel and film reveal a world 'beginning to flower into wounds.' This merging of flesh and blood with steel and plastic is fully embodied within the album's production, which (mirroring Ballard's prose) applies a highly technical and intricately calculated approach, pristine melodies scrubbed of any discernible warmth or familiarity, courtesy of Charli XCX and her team."

On 8 April 2020, Charli told a fan through Zoom that the album was influenced by the music of Janet Jackson, an artist who has frequently been cited by PC Music label producers such as Cook, as well as EasyFun, as a source of inspiration. Then, on 21 April, she told Stereogum that this was her most polished album yet, both musically and artistically, and that she was currently listening to a lot of Jackson's songs. She indicated that the album will be a musical departure for her. On 5 May, she indicated that it will be her most "pop" album yet, and that she wanted the song videos to be extremely theatrical, even suggesting that she play different characters in them. On 29 October, she said that while there was still a lot of Jackson influence on the album at the time, it is no longer exclusively influenced by her, and there are now other inspirations.

On 23 May 2021, she indicated that the album was "for the True Romance angels" and that she wanted to have a song that is "Stay Away 2.0". Then, on 8 July, Charli posted that she was extremely into songs that she did not compose.

Music and lyrics
Crash eschews Charli XCX's previous hyperpop and futurepop work, in favor of "punchy power pop", '80s synth-pop, and dance-pop, with elements of pop-funk, dream pop, eurodance, disco, nu-disco, Italo disco, and "post-Internet glitch". Album opener "Crash" is a new jack swing song with hard funk drums. "Good Ones" explores electropop and synthwave, and "New Shapes" continues the album's '80s synth-pop sound, while adding indie pop and electro-funk into the mix. She samples europop songs "Show Me Love" and "Cry for You" on "Used to Know Me" and "Beg for You", respectively, in an effort to strike a balance between nostalgia and futurism. "Beg for You" additionally is a UK garage song that evokes 2000s bubblegum and '90s house. "Baby" is a post-disco, dance-pop, and pop-funk song with new jack swing elements reminiscent of Janet Jackson's Control and replicates the electro-funk of Cameo. "Lightning" is a techno-pop song with flamenco flourishes, while "Yuck" fuses a 70s funk and boogie baseline with disco and "hyper-modern synths". "Selfish Girl" was dubbed "Dua Lipa-style dance  fantasia".

She has listed Janet Jackson, Cameo, Sister Sledge, Serge Gainsbourg, Steve Vai, Black Eyed Peas, Charlie Puth, Cyndi Lauper, Rick James, Taylor Dayne, Boy Meets Girl, and Belinda Carlisle as musical inspirations for the album. Featured artists on the album include Christine and the Queens and Caroline Polachek on "New Shapes", as well as Rina Sawayama on "Beg for You"; the songs were released as the second and third singles from the album, respectively. Producers on the album include Oscar Holter, and Lotus IV and Deaton Chris Anthony, on the singles "Good Ones" and "New Shapes", respectively. A. G. Cook, George Daniel, Digital Farm Animals, Ian Kirkpatrick, Jason Evigan, Justin Raisen, Ariel Rechtshaid, Ilya Salmanzadeh, Oneohtrix Point Never, Jon Shave, and Mike Wise have also been revealed to have produced other tracks on the album.

Critical reception

Crash received "generally favorable reviews" according to Metacritic, which assigned it an average score of 79 based on 21 reviews.

Writing for Clash, Joe Rivers said that "Crash is certainly a mixed bag, but it does demonstrate that, whatever her motivations and mindset, Charli XCX is an artist we should treasure. Even when she's not at her best, she displays enough nous and melody to stand head and shoulders above practically all her rivals". Elly Watson from DIY gave the album rating 4.5 out of 5 stars and wrote that [Crash] "may be closing a chapter for Charli but it is in no way a swan song". and also added that "Instead, she once again explores new ventures, crafting a pop album that celebrates the old classics as well as the new, and cements her status as a true pop trailblazer". Helen Brown on a five-out-of-five stars review for The Independent, said that Crash is "the biggest, plushest, most mainstream release to date from the shy Essex music nerd turned hot LA diva. And while some fans may miss the 29-year-old's quirkier sonic experiments, there's no denying Charlotte Aitchison's ability to pump out enough relentlessly solid and sexy hooks to secure herself a place at pop's top table... or dancing on top of it." For Pitchfork, Owen Myers says that "Despite a couple of slightly weaker moments (oddly, the album's lead singles), Crash is Charli's best full-length project since Pop 2, a canny embrace of modern and vintage pop styles by one of its most sincere students. It sets a bar for creative mainstream pop: the ruthless, intoxicating dream factory that can chew you up and spit you out and leave you coming back for more."

El Hunt, writing for NME, says that, "At times, Crash eases off the throttle slightly – the interpolation of 'Show Me Love' on 'Used to Know Me' is infectious, if slightly too straightforward, while smouldering ballads 'Move Me' and 'Every Rule' could do with more of the skewed hints of unfamiliarity found in spades elsewhere. These are minor gripes, though, and by the time those synthesised strings whirr into life on the jagged pop-funk track 'Baby' they're easy enough to overlook." While adding that "One emotion that her music will never evoke is boredom, and even when her sights are trained on infiltrating mainstream pop, she's still an artist with a knack for surprising. If Crash really does mark the death of Charli XCX as a major label artist – what a way to go. Fellow critic Tom Hull regarded the production as major and "in some ways the top of her game", while concluding that the album ultimately excels with the "delirious" "Used to Know Me".

Reviewing for Paste, Eric Bennett writes that, "When Charli achieves the perfect confluence of what she loves about pop music, and what we love about her music, it soars, creating some of her finest material to date. But when that balance is not achieved, the songs can feel generic or reductive—two words that have never applied to Charli XCX before. One must commend Charli on taking such a big swing: When you've become known for taking risks, the only way you can change things up is by playing it safe."

In a mixed review for The Guardian, Alexis Petridis writes that "Not only does Crash not work – or at least not entirely – it leaves you wondering about its author's motivations. For all the messaging around it, it sometimes feels less like a smart concept than a shrug; the work of an artist seeing out a fraught five-album major label deal with a half-hearted 'whatever'. If there's a saving grace here, it's that the mercurial XCX – now a free agent – will doubtless return with something more interesting sooner rather than later."

Accolades
Since the album's release, Crash has been named by several magazines as one of the best albums of the year. Commercially, it is Charli XCX's best-selling record, being one of the UK's best-selling vinyl and cassette records.

Awards for Crash

Ranking for Crash Songs

Commercial performance
Crash debuted at number one on the UK Albums Chart with 16,117 units, becoming her first album to top the chart. In Ireland, the album opened at number one on Irish Albums Chart, also scoring her first album to reach the top. In Australia, Crash also debuted at number one on ARIA Albums Chart, becoming her second top-ten entry and the first to reach the top spot. The same week, Crash was also the best-selling album on vinyl. Crash debuted at number one on the Scottish Albums Chart.

In the United States, Crash debuted at number seven on the Billboard 200 with 31,500 equivalent album units (19,000 pure and 15.6 million on-demand official streams), becoming her highest-charting album to date and first top 10 on the chart. In Germany, the album opened at number 19 on Offizielle Deutsche Charts, becoming her first top-20 entry in the country. In Canada, Crash opened at number 16 on Billboard Canadian Albums, becoming her first top-20 entry. In the Netherlands, Crash debuted at number 16 on the Dutch Album Top 100, making it her highest entry on the chart.

Track listing 

Notes
  signifies an additional producer.
 "Beg for You" contains samples of "Don't Cry" by Milk Inc. and "Cry for You" by September.
 "Used to Know Me" contains samples of "Show Me Love" by Robin S.
 "How Can I Not Know What I Need Right Now" contains samples of "Saturday Love" by Cherrelle and Alexander O'Neal.

Personnel

Musicians and vocals 

 Charli XCX – vocals
 George Daniel – vocal chops, drums, bass programming, synth and keys programming 
 Waylon Rector – guitar 
 A. G. Cook – programming, synths 
 Christine and the Queens – vocals 
 Caroline Polachek – vocals 
 Deaton Chris Anthony – additional vocals, synths, drum programming, keyboard programming, bass programming, instrumentation 
 Lotus IV – keyboard programming, bass programming, drum programming, instrumentation 
 Caroline Ailin – background vocals 
 Oscar Holter – programming, drums, bass, keys 
 Rina Sawayama – vocals 
 Sorana – additional backing vocals 
 Sadpony – synths, bass, drum programming 
 Justin Raisen – guitar, FX 
 Ariel Rechtshaid – drum programming, synths, nylon guitar 
 Jon Shave – keyboards, programming 
 Darryl Reid – keyboards, programming

Technical 

 Geoff Swan – mixing 
 Niko Battistini – mix assistance 
 Matt Cahill – mix assistance 
 A. G. Cook – engineering 
 Randy Merrill – mastering
 Şerban Ghenea – mixing 
 Bryce Bordone – mix assistance 
 Lionel Crasta – bridge vocals engineering 
 John Hanes – engineering 
 Oscar Holter – engineering 
 Thomas Warren – engineering 
 Kevin Grainger – mixing 
 Alexander Soifer – additional vocal production 
 Ben Hogarth – vocal engineering 
 Jonathan Gilmore – vocal production & engineering for Rina Sawayama 
 Anthony Tucci Jr. – Charli vocal recording 
 Manny Marroquin – mixing 
 Ian Kirkpatrick – recording 
 Ainjel Emme – assistant engineering 
 Anthony Paul Lopez – engineering 
 Justin Raisen – engineering 
 Sadpony – engineering 
 Rami Yacoub – vocal recording 
 Matt DiMona – engineering 
 Matt Cohn – engineering 
 Jon Shave – engineering 
 Darryl Reid – engineering 
 Oli Jacobs – mixing

Charts

Release history

References 

2022 albums
Atlantic Records albums
Asylum Records albums
Charli XCX albums
Albums produced by A. G. Cook
Albums produced by Ariel Rechtshaid
Albums produced by Digital Farm Animals
Albums produced by Ian Kirkpatrick (record producer)
Ilya
Albums produced by Jason Evigan
Albums produced by Justin Raisen
Albums produced by Daniel Lopatin
Albums produced by Oscar Holter
Power pop albums by English artists